John Trevil Morgan (7 May 1907 – 18 December 1976) was a Welsh cricketer. Morgan was a left-handed batsman who bowled right-arm medium pace and who occasionally fielded as a wicket-keeper. He was born at Cyncoed, Glamorgan, and was educated at Charterhouse School and Jesus College, Cambridge.

Morgan, usually known as "JT", scored a century for Cambridge University in the 1929 University Match: going to the wicket at 137 for 5, he scored 149 out of 208 in three and a half hours. He captained Cambridge in 1930, his final year, when they defeated Oxford. After  graduating with a degree in history, he returned to Cardiff to work in his family's department store, David Morgan, becoming chairman of the company in 1935.

References

External links
Trevil Morgan at ESPNcricinfo
Trevil Morgan at CricketArchive

1907 births
1976 deaths
Cricketers from Cardiff
People educated at Charterhouse School
Alumni of Jesus College, Cambridge
Glamorgan cricketers
Cambridge University cricketers
Cambridge University cricket captains
Wales cricketers
Free Foresters cricketers
20th-century Welsh businesspeople
Businesspeople from Cardiff